The Providence metropolitan area is a region extending into eight counties in two states, and is the 38th largest metropolitan area in the United States. Anchored by the city of Providence, Rhode Island, it has an estimated population of 1,622,520, exceeding that of Rhode Island by slightly over 60%. The area covers almost all of Rhode Island. Thirty-eight of the 39 municipalities in the state are included; only Westerly is not. The Providence Metropolitan Statistical Area also extends into southern Massachusetts with an average population density of 2300 per mi2 (888 per km2). 

The region's Gross Metropolitan Product is the country's 42nd largest at $64.7 billion, just above the Gross State Product of the entire state of Hawaii. Since 2006, the Providence metropolitan area has been officially included in the Greater Boston Combined Statistical Area (CSA), the sixth-largest CSA in the country, with over eight million residents.

Boundaries
The Providence metropolitan area contains towns and cities from all five counties in Rhode Island and one county in Massachusetts, including:

Bristol County, Rhode Island
Kent County, Rhode Island
Newport County, Rhode Island
Providence County, Rhode Island
Washington County, Rhode Island
Bristol County, Massachusetts

The New Bedford metro area is not included in the Providence NECTA, but is included in the Combined NECTA and MSA definitions.

Principal cities
Providence, Rhode Island
Pawtucket, Rhode Island
Fall River, Massachusetts
New Bedford, Massachusetts
Warwick, Rhode Island
Cranston, Rhode Island
Attleboro, Massachusetts

Transportation

Rail 
The Massachusetts Bay Transportation Authority (MBTA) operates a commuter rail connecting the metropolitan area to Boston. There are commuter rail stations in Providence, Pawtucket/Central Falls, South Attleboro, and Attleboro. An extension of the commuter rail to T.F. Green airport in Warwick and Wickford Junction in North Kingstown, Rhode Island was completed in 2012. Extensions to Fall River and New Bedford have also been planned. Amtrak provides regional rail service to the Providence and Kingston train stations as well.

Bus transit 
Rhode Island Public Transit Authority (RIPTA), which has its hub in downtown Providence manages local bus transit for the state, serving 35 out of 39 Rhode Island communities. RIPTA operates 55 bus lines as well as Flex service and paratransit service. Ferry services link Block Island, Prudence Island, and Hog Island to the Rhode Island mainland. Additionally, there is a seasonal ferry service between Providence and Newport from late May to mid-October. Southeastern Regional Transit Authority (SRTA) provides local bus service in the Massachusetts locales of Fall River and New Bedford. The Greater Attleboro Taunton Regional Transit Authority (GATRA) serves from Pawtucket to Middleboro, Bellingham and points eastward, and from Scituate to Bourne.

Air transport 

The major airport is T. F. Green Airport in Warwick, though Logan International Airport in Boston is also used. The MBTA Providence/Stoughton Line passes through T.F. Green and connects the airport to Providence and Boston, offering additional airport flexibility in the Greater Boston Area.

Roads 
Two interstates connect major population centers in the region: 95, which runs diagonally across Rhode Island and connecting with Boston and New York City, and 195, which runs east from Providence into Fall River and New Bedford. The auxiliary interstate 295 provides a bypass around Providence.

Additional highways serving the area include Route 146 (connecting Providence and Worcester), Route 138 (serving Newport), Route 24 (serving Fall River), Route 4 (serving the Wickford area), Route 99 (connecting Route 146 with Woonsocket) and Route 140 (connecting Route 24 with New Bedford).

Demographics

Significant Lusophone populations exist across the region, particularly the area from East Providence to New Bedford. The two Bristol counties (RI and MA) are the only counties in the U.S. in which Portuguese-Americans are the largest ancestry group.

References

 
Metropolitan areas of Rhode Island
Metropolitan areas of Massachusetts
Geography of Greater Boston
Providence, Rhode Island
Regions of Massachusetts
Northeast megalopolis